Léon Flament (born 26 May 1906, date of death unknown) was a Belgian rower who won a bronze medal in the coxed pair at the 1928 Summer Olympics.

References

External links
 

1906 births
Belgian male rowers
Olympic bronze medalists for Belgium
Olympic rowers of Belgium
Rowers at the 1928 Summer Olympics
Year of death missing
Olympic medalists in rowing
Medalists at the 1928 Summer Olympics
20th-century Belgian people